Double Dutch is a 2002 young adult novel by Sharon M. Draper.  It focuses on two teenagers (Delia and Randy) and their very different struggles, which eventually collide and threaten their friendship.

Plot

References

2002 American novels
American young adult novels

Novels set in Cincinnati
Novels about friendship
Atheneum Books books
Novels by Sharon Draper